Gunner and James Storm were an American tag team who competed in Total Nonstop Action Wrestling.

History

Total Nonstop Action Wrestling

TNA World Tag Team Champions and split (2013–2014) 

On the May 23 episode of Impact, James Storm announced that at Slammiversary, he and a partner of his choosing would face Bad Influence, Austin Aries and Bobby Roode, and the World Tag Team Champions Chavo Guerrero Jr. and Hernández in a four-way elimination match for the title. Later on in the episode, Storm chose the returning Gunner as his partner. On June 2 at the pay-per-view, Storm and Gunner won the match by last eliminating Aries and Roode to win the TNA World Tag Team Championships, giving Storm his fifth individual reign and Gunner his first individual reign. Storm and Gunner returned on the August 8 episode of Impact Wrestling, teaming up with ODB to defeat The Bro Mans (Jessie Godderz and Robbie E) and Mickie James in a six-person mixed tag team match. On the August 22 at [[Hardcore Justice (2013)|Impact Wrestling: Hardcore Justice]], Gunner and Storm suffered their first loss as a tag team, losing to Bobby Roode and Kazarian. On the September 5 episode of Impact Wrestling, Gunner and Storm lost to Wes Brisco and Garett Bischoff in a non-title match, after Bischoff hit Gunner in the back of the head with a chain. At Bound for Glory, Gunner and Storm lost the tag team titles to the Bro Mans.

During a match in the TNA Heavyweight Tournament, Gunner threw in the towel for Storm before Bobby Roode could plant Storm through barbed wire. After the match, tensions would continue to rise between Gunner and Storm. On December 12, 2013, in the Feast or fired match Gunner was one of the four participants (along with Zema Ion, Chavo Guerrero and Ethan Carter III) to retrieve a briefcase.  On next week's episode, his case contained a match for the World Heavyweight Championship, further angering James Storm, whom Gunner had stolen the briefcase from. Gunner put the briefcase on the line against Storm on the December 26, 2013 episode of Impact Wrestling, but the match ended in a double countout, so Gunner retained the case. Gunner then retained the case again against Storm at Genesis, where the case was suspended from a pole.  Gunner and Storm made amends at the January 30th episode of Impact, they were then challenged by Bad Influence with the condition if either Kazarian or Daniels won that they would get Gunner's briefcase.  However Storm and Gunner would win the match. On the February 13, 2014, episode of Impact Wrestling Gunner and Storm defeated Ethan Carter III along with Magnus in a tag team ladder match to win the TNA World Tag Team Championship feat or fired briefcase. On the February 20th edition of Impact Wrestling'' Gunner cashed in his briefcase against Magnus for the TNA World Heavyweight Championship. James Storm came to ringside and turned heel when he kicked Gunner in the head costing him a match and the championship, disbanding the team.

Championships and accomplishments
Total Nonstop Action Wrestling
TNA World Tag Team Championship (1 time)
Feast or Fired (2013 – TNA World Tag Team Championship contract) - Storm
Feast or Fired (2013 – TNA World Heavyweight Championship contract) - Gunner

References

Impact Wrestling teams and stables